Hasania tribe also known as Hassania tribe, are members of a Muslim tribe of Arab origin.

Hassania or al-Hassania may also refer to:


Places
El Hassania, a town in northern Algeria
Hassania School of Public Works, Casablanca, Morocco, one of Morocco's oldest engineering schools

Sports
Hassania Agadir or Hassania Union Sport Agadir, a Moroccan sports club based in Agadir, Morocco
Hassania Athletic Sidi Slimane, Moroccan football club
Hassania Sportive Ben Slimane, also called HSB Slimane, Moroccan football club

Persons
El-Hassania Darami (born 1953), Moroccan long-distance runner

See also
Hassan (disambiguation)
Hassani (disambiguation)